The I Corps was a formation of the Finnish Army during the Winter War. It was formed on February 25 from parts of the II Corps which had become too large to function properly. It fought during the final stages of the war on the front north of Viipuri.

Order of battle 
 1st Division 
 2nd Division (former 11th Division)

Commander 
 Major General Taavetti Laatikainen (19.02.1940 - 13.03.1940).

References 
 
 

Military units and formations of Finland in the Winter War
Military units and formations of Finland in World War II